Anushae Babar Gill (Urdu,), popularly known as Shae Gill, is a Pakistani singer and cover-artist, mostly known for her Punjabi duet song "Pasoori" with Ali Sethi.

Early life 
Shae Gill was born and raised in Lahore, Pakistan to a Christian family. She was a student at Forman Christian College.

Career 
Shae Gill started her career as a cover-artist on Instagram in 2019. She mainly posted cover songs on Instagram, before releasing her debut original duet "Pasoori" with Ali Sethi.

Discography

Lead artist

Featured artist

References

External links 
 
 
 Shae Gill on Instagram

Living people
Pakistani pop singers
Pakistani playback singers
Pakistani Christians
People from Lahore
Punjabi people
Punjabi-language singers
Urdu playback singers
Forman Christian College alumni
1999 births